The Italian School of Archaeology at Athens is one of the 19 foreign archaeological institutes headquartered in Athens, Greece, with branch offices in Crete, Limnos and Rome.

Following earlier Italian research in Greece (as an archaeological "expedition" or "mission"), the School was established in 1909. The School operates a sizeable library in Athens. It has conducted archaeological surveys in Aigialeia (Arcadia) and Thouria (Messenia), and excavations on Lemnos at Poliochne, Hephaistia, and Chloe, as well as on Crete, at the Minoan Palace at Phaistos and the nearby Minoan town of Agia Triada, and also in the Archaic through Roman city of Gortyn.

References

Bibliography
E. Korka et al. (eds.): Foreign Archaeological Schools in Greece, 160 Years, Athens, Hellenic Ministry of Culture, 2006.

External links
SAIA website

1909 establishments in Greece
Foreign Archaeological Institutes in Greece
Greece–Italy relations
Educational institutions established in 1909